Robert Mayer is a New York Times-bestselling author and the CEO of Cool Gus Publishing.  He is a West Point graduate and former Green Beret.  Mayer has authored over 60 novels in multiple genres, selling more than 4 million books, including the #1 series Area 51, Atlantis, and The Green Berets.  He has written under the pen names Joe Dalton, Robert Doherty, Greg Donegan, and Bob McGuire.  He holds the distinction of being the only male author on the Romance Writers of America Honor Roll.

Early life
Robert John "Bob" Mayer was born in the Bronx, New York City on October 21, 1959. After high school, Mayer was accepted to the United States Military Academy at West Point. There, he graduated with honors in the top 10 percent of his class, earning a BA in psychology in 1981. He later earned a master's degree in Education at Austin Peay State University.

In the Army, Mayer served in the infantry with the 1st Cavalry Division, later as platoon leader and a brigade recon platoon leader. He joined Special Forces and commanded a Green Berets A-Team from 1984 to 1988.  He served as the operations officer for 2nd Battalion, 10th Special Forces Group (Airborne) and with Special Operations Command (Special Projects) in Hawaii.  He later taught Green Beret recruits at the John F. Kennedy Special Warfare Center and School in Fort Bragg, NC.

Mayer is an honor graduate of the Special Forces Qualification Course, the John F. Kennedy Special Warfare Center and School Instructor Training Course and the Danish Royal Navy Fromandkorpset.  He is a Master Parachutist/Jumpmaster Qualified and graduated from the International Mountain Climbing School.  He has completed 14 marathons, including qualifying for the Boston Marathon and running it three times.

Writing career
Mayer's prolific writing encompasses both his military experience and his fascination for history, legends and mythology. To date, he has published over 65 titles. Though most of his novels reside within the realm of science fiction, he has crossed successfully into multiple genres including historical, military, suspense, young adult and romance.  His books have hit on numerous bestselling lists including The New York Times, USA Today, The Wall Street Journal, and Publishers Weekly.

Mayer began his writing career in 1991 with the Green Beret novel Eyes of the Hammer. The next year, he followed with his second novel, Dragon Sim-13. A total of 9 books have been written in the series.

In 1997, under his pen name Robert Doherty, Mayer released Area 51.  He wrote eight sequels to Area 51 from 1998 to 2004. Four more were published from 2018 to 2020.

In September 2004, Mayer met romance novelist Jennifer Crusie at a writer's conference in Maui. The pair collaborated on a series of military-themed romance novels - Don't Look Down (2006), Agnes and the Hitman (2007), and Wild Ride (2009). Mayer and Crusie's unique collaborations took place via email, with Mayer writing from the male perspective and Crusie writing those scenes that involved the female perspective. Agnes and the Hitman became a NYT bestseller, earning Mayer a spot on the Romance Writers of America Honor Roll.

In 2009, Mayer realized a rapidly evolving digital transition in the publishing industry was happening. Along with Jen Talty, Mayer formed Cool Gus Publishing (formerly Who Dares Wins Publishing) in 2010 as a platform to reissue his extensive backlist. Cool Gus Publishing authors currently include Colin Falconer, Jennifer Probst, Janice Maynard, and Amy Shojai.
  
Mayer has also written five books in the Nightstalkers series for the Amazon Publishing imprint 47North.

In addition to his writing and publishing career, Mayer has been a speaker at the Maui Writer's Conference. He holds workshops and seminars on the leadership tactics learned in his Green Beret training. He has been featured in The Wall Street Journal, Forbes, Sports Illustrated, PBS, NPR, the Military Channel and the SyFy Channel.

Personal life
Bob Mayer resides in Tennessee with his wife and their English Yellow Lab, Cool Gus and their newest addition,  Scout the dog.  His most recent books include the Time Patrol series, featuring characters from both The Nightstalkers and The Cellar series of books.

Published works
Green Beret series
 1991: Eyes of the Hammer -
 1992: Dragon Sim-13 -
 1994: Synbat -
 1995: Cut-Out -
 1996: Eternity Base -
 1996: Z -
 2010: Chasing the Ghost -
 2013: Chasing the Lost -
 2015: Chasing the Son -
Area 51 series
 1997: Area 51 -
 1998: Area 51: The Reply -
 1999: Area 51: The Mission -
 2000: Area 51: The Sphinx -
 2001: Area 51: The Grail -
 2002: Area 51: Excalibur -
 2003: Area 51: The Truth -
 2003: Area 51: Nosferatu -
 2004: Area 51: Legend -
 2018: Area 51: Redemption -
 2018: Area 51: Invasion -
 2019: Area 51: Interstellar -
 2020: Area 51: Earth Abides -
Nightstalkers series
 2012: Nightstalkers -
 2013: The Book of Truths -
 2014: The Rift -
 Time Patrol series
 2015: Time Patrol -
 2015: Black Tuesday -
 2016: Ides of March -
 2016: D-Day -
 2016: Independence Day -
 2016: Nine Eleven -
 2016: The Fifth Floor -
 2017: Valentine's Day 
 2017: All Hallow's Eve
Black Ops series
 1998: The Omega Missile -
 2000: The Omega Sanction -
Atlantis series
 1999: Atlantis -
 2000: Bermuda Triangle -
 2001: Devil's Sea -
 2002: Atlantis Gate -
 2003: Assault on Atlantis -
 2004: Battle for Atlantis -
Psychic Warrior books
 2000: Psychic Warrior -
 2001: Project Aura -
The Cellar books
 2005: Bodyguard of Lies -
 2007: Lost Girls -
Jim Vaughn books
 2005: Section 8 -
 2007: The Citadel -
Presidential thrillers
 2011: The Jefferson Allegiance -
 2013: The Kennedy Endeavor -
 Burners series
 2015: Burners - with Deb Cavanaugh
 2015: Prime - with Deb Cavanaugh
Shadow Warriors series
 1996: Black Ops: The Rock -
 1997: Black Ops: The Line -
 1998: Black Ops: The Gate -
Duty, Honor, Country series
 2011: Duty, Honor, Country: A Novel of West Point to The Civil War -
 2015: From West Point to Mexico -
 2015: From Mexico to Sumter - (ASIN B00HZXJB5A)
 2016: Sumter to Shiloh - (ASIN B00HZXJQ7I)
Standalone novels
 2006: Don't Look Down - - with Jennifer Crusie
 2007: Agnes and the Hitman - with Jennifer Crusie
 2009: Wild Ride - - with Jennifer Crusie
 2012: I, Judas: The 5th Gospel -
Non-fiction
 2001: The Fiction Writer's Toolkit -
 2003: The Novel Writer's Toolkit -
 2005: Who Dares Wins -
 2005: Hunting Al Qaeda - (ASIN B000K43PSU)
 2011: Writer's Conference Guide - (ASIN B0052) with Jen Talty
 2011: Write It Forward - previously published as Warrior Writer
 2012: The Shelfless Book: The Complete Digital Author - with Jen Talty
 2012: The Green Beret Survival Guide: For the Apocalypse, Zombies and More -
 2015: Shit Doesn't Just Happen Volume I: Titanic, Kegworth, Custer, et al. -
 2015: Shit Doesn't Just Happen Vol II: Challenger, Kursk, Sultana, et al. -
 2016: Prepare Now Survive Later -
 2016: Survive Now Thrive Later -

Notes
"Is there gold in your backlist? Self-publish and find out!" by Alan Rinzler Forbes 5/18/11

References

External links 
 
 

1959 births
20th-century American novelists
21st-century American novelists
American alternate history writers
American fantasy writers
American male novelists
American romantic fiction writers
American science fiction writers
American thriller writers
Living people
United States Military Academy alumni
Writers from New York City
20th-century American male writers
21st-century American male writers
Novelists from New York (state)